Lorena Briceño (born April 19, 1978 in Neuquén) is a female judoka from Argentina. She competed for her native South American country at the 2008 Summer Olympics and won a bronze medal at the 2007 Pan American Games in Rio de Janeiro, Brazil.

References
sports-reference

1978 births
Argentine female judoka
Judoka at the 1999 Pan American Games
Judoka at the 2003 Pan American Games
Judoka at the 2007 Pan American Games
Judoka at the 2008 Summer Olympics
Judoka at the 2011 Pan American Games
Living people
Olympic judoka of Argentina
Pan American Games bronze medalists for Argentina
Pan American Games medalists in judo
South American Games gold medalists for Argentina
South American Games medalists in judo
Competitors at the 2006 South American Games
Medalists at the 1999 Pan American Games
Medalists at the 2007 Pan American Games
People from Neuquén
20th-century Argentine women
21st-century Argentine women